A Man and His Soul is a 1967 compilation of studio and live performances by Ray Charles. The LP version includes an album size booklet containing biographical information, photos, and details on his recordings.

Track listing 
Side 1
 "I Can't Stop Loving You" (Don Gibson) – 4:13
 "What'd I Say" [Live] (Ray Charles) – 4:30
 "Ol' Man River" (Jerome Kern, Oscar Hammerstein) – 5:33
 "One Mint Julep" (Randolph Toombs) – 3:02
 "Crying Time" (Buck Owens) – 2:54
 "Makin' Whoopee" [Live] (Gus Kahn, Walter Donaldson) – 2:16

Side 2
 "Busted" (Harlan Howard) – 2:06
 "Takes Two to Tango" (Al Hoffman, Dick Manning) – 3:17
 "Ruby" (Mitchell Parish, Heinz Roemheld) – 3:51
 "Let's Go Get Stoned" (Nickolas Ashford, Valerie Simpson, Josie Armstead) – 2:57
 "Cry" (Churchill Kohlman) – 3:31
 "Unchain My Heart" (A. Jones, F. James) – 2:52

Side 3
 "Georgia on My Mind" (Stuart Gorrell, Hoagy Carmichael) – 3:37
 "Baby, It's Cold Outside" (Frank Loesser) – 4:05
 "Worried Mind" (Jimmie Davis, Ted Daffan) – 2.54
 "I Chose to Sing the Blues" (Jimmy Holiday, Charles) – 2:28
 "I Don't Need No Doctor" (Ashford, Simpson) – 2:29
 "Born to Lose" (Frankie Brown) – 3:15

Side 4
 "Hit the Road Jack" (Percy Mayfield) – 2:00
 "You Are My Sunshine" (Jimmie Davis, Charles Mitchell) – 2:58
 "From the Heart" (Charles) – 3:30
 "Teardrops from My Eyes" (Toombs) – 3:22
 "No Use Crying" (Roy Gaines, Johnny B. Daniels, Freddy Kober) – 3:15
 "Chitlin's With Canned Yams" (Charles) – 4:34

Certifications and sales

References

Ray Charles compilation albums
Ray Charles live albums
1967 compilation albums
1967 live albums
ABC Records compilation albums